State Road 516 (NM 516) is a  state highway in the US state of New Mexico. NM 516's southern terminus is at U.S. Route 64 (US 64) in Farmington, and the northern terminus is at US 550 in Aztec.

Major intersections

See also

References

516
Transportation in San Juan County, New Mexico